Qamil Teliti (9 July 1922 – 7 December 1977), nicknamed Tarzani, was an Albanian footballer known for being one of the most important players of the Albania team that won the Balkan Cup in 1946. Along with Loro Boriçi he was one of the artifices of the success of the team. He was posthumously honoured for his services to Albanian football in 2018.

Club career
Teliti started his senior career at hometown club Besa Kavajë during the mid-late 1930s. He was known for his powerful right foot and scoring from long distances. This earned him the reputation as the most feared striker in the country and soon attracted the attention of the national team. He was a successful player for Besa and went on to compete for all three of Tirana's professional clubs.

Qamil Teliti competed in over 30 international matches for Besa, Dinamo, Tirana, Partizani and Vllaznia.

International career
He made his debut and scored the first ever goal for Albania in a friendly not recognised by FIFA against Montenegro, played in Shkodër on 22 September 1946. Albania won the match 5–0. Teliti also scored the final goal of the match in the '75th minute. On 13 October 1946 in the match against Romania during the Balkan Championship tournament, Teliti scored the only goal of the match in the '55th minute. It was a powerful long distance shot that beat goalkeeper Lăzăreanu. Albania became Balkan Champion and Teliti's legacy was forever cemented in the hearts and minds of all football fans around the country.

He earned a total of 13 caps, scoring 6 goals. His final international was a December 1952 friendly match against Czechoslovakia.

Honours
Albanian Superliga: 4
 1950, 1951, 1952, 1953

Balkan Cup: 1
 1946

References

External links

1922 births
1977 deaths
Footballers from Kavajë
Albanian footballers
Association football forwards
Albania international footballers
Besa Kavajë players
FK Partizani Tirana players
FK Dinamo Tirana players
KF Tirana players
KF Apolonia Fier players
Kategoria Superiore players